The olive-backed euphonia (Euphonia gouldi) is a small passerine bird in the finch family. It is a resident breeder in the Caribbean lowlands and foothills from southern Mexico to western Panama.

The olive-backed euphonia is found in wet forests, tall second growth and adjacent bushy clearings, typically from sea level to 750 m altitude, sometimes up to 1000 m.  The spherical cup nest, with a side entrance, is hidden amongst epiphytes or mosses 2–11 m high in a tree. The normal clutch is three brown-marked white eggs.

The adult olive-backed euphonia is 9.5 cm long and weighs 12 g. The adult male has glossy olive upperparts, a yellow forehead, and a rufous belly surrounded by yellow. The adult female has less glossy upperparts than the male, a chestnut forehead, yellow underparts and a small rufous belly patch. Immatures are darker, duller, and have olive underparts.

The olive-backed euphonia occurs in small groups, or as part of a mixed-species feeding flock. This species feeds mainly on small  fruits.

The olive-backed euphonia's call is a metallic  , and the song is mixture of the call with clear or nasal whistles.

The scientific species name commemorates John Gould, the English ornithologist.

References

 Stiles and Skutch,  A guide to the birds of Costa Rica  

olive-backed euphonia
Birds of Belize
Birds of Central America
olive-backed euphonia
olive-backed euphonia